The Cypriot First Division is the top division of women's football in Cyprus. It has been running since its establishment by the Cyprus Football Association (C.F.A) and its originator Tassos Katsikidis (vice-president of the board) during the 1998–99 season.

The winning team of the league qualifies for a spot in the UEFA Women's Champions League. Although a Cypriot team entered the Champions League every year from 2003–04 onwards, in 2008–09 Apollon Limassol became the first team to win a point in those competitions. There is no second league in Cyprus as of 2014, thus there is no relegation in place.

2017–18 teams

2018–19 teams

2019–20 teams
The season will start at 15 September 2019.

Current format
Each club plays the other sides twice, for a total of 18 games for each club. In the second round the teams ranked 1-5 play off for the title and teams finishing 6-10 play each other. Teams receive three points for a win and one point for a draw. The league champions qualify for the UEFA Women's Champions League.

List of champions 
Champions so far are:

Performance by club

References

External links
Official website 
 League at UEFA
League at Soccerway

Top level women's association football leagues in Europe
1
Women
Women's sports leagues in Cyprus